White dove may refer to:
 White or albino Columbidae
 Peace dove
 Doves as symbols (Peace doves, Noah's dove, the holy spirit as dove)
 "White Dove", a new interpretation of the 1969 Omega song "Gyöngyhajú lány" by the Scorpions
 "White, White Dove", a 1976 song by Steve Harley & Cockney Rebel
 "Paloma Blanca" (Spanish White Dove), a 1975 song by George Baker
 "White Dove", a 2003 song by Starsailor from their album Silence Is Easy

See also 

 The White Dove (disambiguation)
 Palomita Blanca (Little White Dove), a 1971 novel by Enrique Lafourcade
 Little White Dove (Palomita blanca), a 1973 Chilean comedy film
 "Palomita Blanca", a 1999 song by Juan Luis Guerra and 440